Sratsimir was a Bulgarian magnate with the title of Despot, holding the territory of Kran.

Sratsimir or Sracimir  may also refer to:

 Ivan Sratsimir of Bulgaria, emperor (tsar) of Bulgaria in Vidin from 1356 to 1396
 Sratsimir dynasty, Bulgarian dynasty
 Sratsimir Hill, hill in Graham Land, Antarctica
 Sratsimirovo, village in Gramada Municipality, Bulgaria
 Sratsimir (village), a village in Silistra Municipality, Silistra Province, Bulgaria